Gegenes is a genus of skippers in the family Hesperiidae.

Species
Gegenes hottentota (Latreille, 1824)
Gegenes nostrodamus (Fabricius, 1793)
Gegenes pumilio (Hoffmannsegg, 1804)
Gegenes niso (Linnaeus, 1764)

References
Natural History Museum Lepidoptera genus database

External links
Gegenes at funet

Hesperiinae
Hesperiidae genera